The Michelle Rosaldo  Book Prize was established in 2015 by the Association for Femininist Anthropology (AFA) in honor of anthropologist Michelle Rosaldo (1944-1981). Rosaldo is recognized for her research on the Ilongot people of the Philippines and for her leading role in the anthropology of gender. The prize is awarded to a first book by an author that makes a significant contribution to feminist anthropology.

List of winners

See also

 List of anthropology awards

See also
Ruth Benedict Prize

References 

anthropology awards